Dewan's Road, officially known as Seshadri Iyer Road is an important main street in downtown Mysore city, Karnataka state, India.

Location
Dewan's Road is located on the western side of the city center.  Other important roads like the Devaraj Urs Road, Vinobha Road and the Chamaraja Double Road connect with it.
Dewans Road begins from the back of Cheluvambra Hospital near Sapna Bookstall. It passes the western side of the Freedom fighters Park and terminates near the eastern side of the R.T.O.Circle.

Important Landmarks
 Jain Bhavan
 Lakshmi Hayagreeva Institute
 Freedom fighters Park
 Sushrutha Eye Hospital
 Marimallappa School
 Karnataka Lokayuktha
 Oriental Bank of Commerce

Length
Dewan's Road is about 1.55 kilometers in length. The end of the Dewans Road goes up to RTO circle after landmarks like Remya Mahendra Restaurant, Shubham Dewans Apartments, Tata Car service and Bharath Travels.

History
The origin of the Dewans Road dates back to the time of the king of Mysore.  After independence, this historic road was neglected for some and became unhygienic in repair.  A makaerover was introduced in 2016 with paintings and portrains of eminent persons.  Artists from CAVA (Chamarajendra Academy of Visual Arts) contributed to this change. A tower clock is also being made here.

Post Office
The pincode of Dewan's Road is 570001 as it comes under Devaraja Mohalla Post Office.

See also
 Devaraj Urs Road, Mysore

Image gallery

References

Suburbs of Mysore
Roads in Mysore
Mysore North